The 2018–19 ABA League Second Division was the 2nd season of the ABA Second Division with 12 teams from Bosnia and Herzegovina, Croatia, Montenegro, North Macedonia, Serbia, and Slovenia participating in it.

Format changes
On March 13, 2018, the Adriatic League Assembly decided to abolish the National standings and, as of the 2018–19 season, participants are determined only based on the results in the competitions under the umbrella of the Adriatic League (First Division and Second Division). According to that, the promotion to the First Division is possible only from the Second Division. The last placed of the 2017–18 First Division season lose the right to participate in the 2018–19 season and its place is given to the 2017–18 Champion of the Second Division. Also, as of the 2018–19 season, the 11th placed team of the 2018–19 First Division season and the runners-up of the 2018–19 Second Division season will play in the Qualifiers for a spot in the 2019–20 First Division season. The format of the Qualifiers will be best of three, while the home court advantage will be given to the team that played in the First Division in the previous season.

The maximum number of clubs from one country in the First Division is five, while in the Second Division each country will have two participants. The last placed club in the First Division will have a guaranteed place in the Second Division in the following season. The confirmed competition system shall not be changed until the end of the 2024–25 season, if there are no significant changes in the European basketball by then.

Instead of the Final Four tournament, as of the 2018–19 season, the Second Division champion will be given after the Playoffs, where four best teams of the regular season will compete. The last placed club in the 2017–18 season loses the right to participate in the 2018–19 season, regardless of its result in the national championship.

Teams

Team allocation 
Macedonian League champions Rabotnički withdrew their place in 2018–19 season, as well as the semifinalists Kumanovo and Blokotehna. Their place was taken by Serbian team Vršac. 

The labels in the parentheses show how each team qualified for the place of its starting round:
1st, 2nd, etc.: National League position after Playoffs
ABA1: Relegated from the First Division

Venues and locations

Personnel and sponsorship

Coaching changes

Regular season

League table

Positions by round

Results

Playoffs

Bracket

Semifinals

Finals

Promotion playoffs 
As of the 2018–19 season, the 11th placed team of the 2018–19 First Division season and the runners-up of the 2018–19 Second Division season will play in the Qualifiers for a spot in the 2019–20 First Division season. The format of the Qualifiers will be best of three, while the home court advantage will be given to the team that played in the First Division in the previous season.

Teams 
 First Division 11th place:   Zadar
 Second Division 2nd place:  MZT Skopje Aerodrom

As the team, coming from the ABA League, Zadar had the home court advantage in the first and third game of the series, while MZT was the host of the second game of the Qualifiers series. Zadar won the series 2−1 and kept its First League status.

Results 

|}

MVP of the Round

Source: ABA League Second Division

Attendances
Attendances do not include playoff games yet:

See also 
 List of current ABA League Second Division team rosters
 2018–19 ABA League First Division

2018–19 domestic competitions
  2018–19 Basketball League of Serbia
  2018–19 Premijer liga
  2018–19 Slovenian Basketball League
  2018–19 Prva A liga
  2018–19 Basketball Championship of Bosnia and Herzegovina
  2018–19 Macedonian First League

References

External links 
 Official website (Second Division)
 Official website (First Division)
 ABA League at Eurobasket.com

2018-19
2018–19 in European second tier basketball leagues
2018–19 in Serbian basketball
2018–19 in Slovenian basketball
2018–19 in Croatian basketball
2018–19 in Bosnia and Herzegovina basketball
2018–19 in Montenegrin basketball
2018–19 in North Macedonia basketball